Gamma Herculis, Latinized from γ Herculis, is a magnitude 3.74 binary star system in the northern constellation of Hercules.

Properties
This is known to be a spectroscopic binary system, although there is no information about the secondary component. The spectrum of the primary star matches a stellar classification of A9III, which indicates this is a giant star that has exhausted the hydrogen at its core and evolved away from the main sequence. The effective temperature is about 7,031 K, giving the star a white hue characteristic of A-type stars.

Observations by German astronomer Ernst Zinner in 1929 gave indications that this may be a variable star. It was listed in the New Catalogue of Suspected Variable Stars (1981) with a magnitude range of 3.74 to 3.81. Further observations up to 1991 showed a pattern of small, slow variations with a magnitude variation of 0.05. These appeared to repeat semi-regularly with a period of 183.6 days, although the spectroscopic data presented a longer period of 165.9 days.

Name
It was a member of indigenous Arabic asterism al-Nasaq al-Sha'āmī, "the Northern Line" of al-Nasaqān "the Two Lines", along with β Her (Kornephoros), γ Ser (Zheng, Ching) and β Ser (Chow).

According to the catalogue of stars in the Technical Memorandum 33-507 - A Reduced Star Catalog Containing 537 Named Stars, al-Nasaq al-Sha'āmī or Nasak Shamiya were the title for three stars :β Ser as Nasak Shamiya I, γ Ser as Nasak Shamiya II, γ Her as Nasak Shamiya III (exclude β Her)

Héjiān (河間) was westernized into Ho Keen by R.H. Allen, which was the meaning "between the river".

References

Hercules (constellation)
Spectroscopic binaries
Herculis, 020
Herculis, Gamma
A-type giants
080170
Semiregular variable stars
6095
147547
Durchmusterung objects